Lydia Miller Beachy (1863–1925) was an American quilter born in Grantsville, MD. Her work is included in the collections of the Smithsonian American Art Museum and the Illinois State Museum.

References

1863 births
1925 deaths
19th-century American women artists
20th-century American women artists
Quilters